Lancaster City Council elections are held every four years. Lancaster City Council is the local authority for the non-metropolitan district of Lancaster in Lancashire, England. Since the last boundary changes in 2015, 60 councillors have been elected from 27 wards.

Political control

Lancaster was a municipal borough from 1836 to 1974, and also held city status from 1937. The city's territory was substantially expanded under the Local Government Act 1972 to include several nearby towns and villages, and becoming a non-metropolitan district. The first election to the reconstituted city council was held in 1973, initially operating as a shadow authority until the new arrangements took effect on 1 April 1974. Political control of the council since 1973 has been held by the following parties:

Leadership
The leaders of the council since 1993 have been:

Council elections
1973 Lancaster City Council election
1976 Lancaster City Council election
1979 Lancaster City Council election (New ward boundaries)
1983 Lancaster City Council election
1987 Lancaster City Council election
1991 Lancaster City Council election (City boundary changes took place but the number of seats remained the same)
1995 Lancaster City Council election
1999 Lancaster City Council election
2003 Lancaster City Council election (New ward boundaries)
2007 Lancaster City Council election
2011 Lancaster City Council election
2015 Lancaster City Council election (New ward boundaries)
2019 Lancaster City Council election

Election results

By-elections

1995–1999

1999–2003

2003–2007

2007–2011

2015–2019

Labour Cllr Karen Leytham (Skerton West) resigned in July 2017. A by-election was held:
Independent Cllr Paul Woodruff (Halton-with-Aughton) resigned in July 2017. A by-election was held:

Labour Cllr Roger Sherlock (Skerton West) died in November 2017. A by-election was held:

University and Scotforth Rural ward Labour councillors Sam Armstrong (elected Green) and Lucy Atkinson retired in March 2018. A double by-election was held.

2019–2023 
Conservative councillor Michael Smith (Overton), who is partially deaf resigned in November 2019 because he was "struggling to hear" in meetings. A by-election was held the next month, on the same day as the 2019 United Kingdom general election.

In June 2020, Liberal Democrat councillor Michael Mumford (Kellet) died. Due to the COVID-19 pandemic, no council by-elections will take place in the UK until May 2021 at the earliest.

Jack O'Dwyer-Henry, Eco-Socialist Independent (elected Labour) councillor for the University and Scotforth Rural ward, resigned from the council, triggering a by-election in the ward.

References

 By-election results

External links
Lancaster City Council

 
Council elections in Lancashire
Local government in Lancaster
Politics of Lancaster
District council elections in England